Flaugnac (Languedocien: Flaunhac) is a former commune in the Lot department in south-western France. On 1 January 2016, it was merged into the new commune of Saint-Paul-Flaugnac.

Geography
The Barguelonne forms most of the commune's northwestern border.

See also
Communes of the Lot department

References

Former communes of Lot (department)